Nore og Uvdal is a municipality in Viken county, Norway.  It is part of the traditional region of Numedal.  The administrative centre of the municipality is the village of Rødberg.

The area of Nore was separated from the municipality of Rollag in 1858. The municipality of Nore was divided into two municipalities on 1 January 1901: Nore and Uvdal.  These two municipalities were merged back together on 1 January 1962, and the new municipality was called Nore og Uvdal.

General information

Name
The municipalities of Nore and Uvdal were joined together in 1962 into Nore og Uvdal.

The Old Norse form of Nore was Nórar. The name is the plural form of nór which means "narrow sound or strait". The name originally belonged to the vicarage (and church site) at Norefjorden.

The Old Norse form of Uvdal was Uppdalr. The first element is upp meaning "upper" or "high" and the last element is dalr which means "valley" or "dale". The name originally belonged to the vicarage and old church site. Prior to 1933, the name was spelled "Opdal".

Coat-of-arms
The coat-of-arms is from modern times.  It was granted on 26 March 1982.  The arms are divided diagonally with the colors green on yellow above the line and yellow on green below.  The economy of the municipality is based on agriculture and forestry. Hence the upper half of the arms shows a barn for the storage of grains and the lower half a watermill wheel which was used to saw trees.

Geography

The municipal centre is the village of Rødberg. Nore and Uvdal are the two other villages in the municipality.

Nore og Uvdal is bordered in the north by the municipalities of Hol, Ål, and Nes; in the east by Flå and Sigdal; in the south by  Rollag, Tinn, and Vinje (the latter two in Telemark county); and in the west by Eidfjord (in Vestland county).

It is located on the border with Tinn municipality in Telemark county. A large part of the Hardangervidda lies within the municipality's borders.

Lakes in the municipality include  Geitsjøen and Hettefjorden.

Attractions
 Langedrag Naturpark (Langedrag Nature Park) - a resort in the mountain focusing on ecology and animals
 Uvdal Skisenter - alpine resort located in Uvdal
 Uvdal Alpinpark - alpine resort located in Uvdal, on the other side of the valley
 Nore Stave Church - built around 1166 - 1200
 Uvdal Stave Church - originally constructed just after the year 1168

Notable people 
 Johnny Lunde (1923 in Nore – 2013) an alpine skier and engineer, participated at the 1948 and 1952 Winter Olympics
 Frode Thingnæs (1940 in Nore og Uvdal – 2012) a Norwegian jazz composer, arranger, conductor and trombone player

Sister cities
The following cities are twinned with Nore og Uvdal:
  Juupajoki, Western Finland, Finland
  Surahammar, Västmanland County, Sweden
  Wahlstedt, Schleswig-Holstein, Germany

Gallery

References

External links

Municipal fact sheet from Statistics Norway
Nore og Uvdal kommune 
Map of Nore og Uvdal showing points of culture from Kulturnett.no 
EKT Langedrag Naturpark 
Uvdal - official visitor information 

 
Municipalities of Buskerud
Municipalities of Viken (county)